The dwell time in GNSS is the time required to test for the presence of a satellite signal for a certain combination of parameters. A GNSS satellite can be detected if it is present or not on a sky through a search process, based on correlation of a received signal with a reference signal stored in the receiver.
 
The dwell times are associated with the performance of a certain detector. They can be classified into single dwell times, when the decision is taken in one step, and multiple dwell times, when the decision is taken in two or more steps.

References

Works cited

 N. Couronneau, P.J. Duffett-Smith, and A. Mitelman, Calculating Time-to-First-Fix, GPS World, Nov 2011 (GPS World 2011)
 E.S. Lohan, A. Lakhzouri, and M. Renfors, Selection of the multiple-dwell hybrid-search strategy for the  acquisition of Galileo signals in  fading channels, in CDROM Proc. of  IEEE PIMRC, Sep 2004. (Lohan2004)

Global Positioning System